Bull Lake is a settlement in York County, New Brunswick on Route 595.

History

Bull Lake has also been known as Green Lake and had a post office branch there in the years 1903 to 1912.  The settlement is named after a nearby lake also called Bull Lake. There is one small family cemetery.

Bulmer Field is located to the north.

Notable people

See also
List of communities in New Brunswick

References

Communities in York County, New Brunswick